James Stephenson (10 February 1895 – 1 February 1958) was an English professional footballer who made over 190 appearances in the Football League for Watford as an outside right. He also played league football for Aston Villa, Sunderland and Queens Park Rangers.

Personal life 
Stephenson's brothers were England international footballers Clem and George and he was the uncle of sportsman Bob Stephenson. In May 1917, nearly three years since the outbreak of the First World War, Stephenson enlisted in the Royal Field Artillery and saw action on the Western Front and later served as part of the British Army of the Rhine. For a period while a professional footballer, he ran the Nascot Arms pub in Watford.

Career statistics

References

1958 deaths
People from Seaton Delaval
Footballers from Northumberland
English Football League players
Aston Villa F.C. players
Sunderland A.F.C. players
Watford F.C. players
Queens Park Rangers F.C. players
Ashington A.F.C. players
English footballers
Leeds City F.C. wartime guest players
1895 births
Association football outside forwards
Boston Town F.C. (1920s) players
British publicans
British Army personnel of World War I
Royal Field Artillery soldiers